The 2022 Ahmad Shah Abdali 4-day Tournament was the fifth edition of the Ahmad Shah Abdali 4-day Tournament, a first-class cricket tournament in Afghanistan that was played in October and November 2022. The tournament consisted of a round-robin played across two venues, with the first five matches played at the Ghazi Amanullah International Cricket Stadium in Nangahar Province and the remaining five matches and the final played at the Khost Cricket Stadium. Band-e-Amir Region are the defending champions. Five regional teams competed in the tournament.

Amo Region won their maiden title due to claiming a first innings lead in the drawn final against Band-e-Amir Region.

Round-robin

Points table

 Advanced to the final

Fixtures

Final

References

External links
 Series home at ESPN Cricinfo

Afghan domestic cricket competitions
Ahmad Shah Abdali 4-day Tournament
Ahmad Shah Abdali 4-day Tournament